The Fisher Mariah is an American two-seat single-engined monoplane designed for amateur construction originally by Fisher Aero Corporation. Today the aircraft is supplied in the form of a kit or plans for amateur construction by Mike Fisher Aircraft.

Development
The Mariah is a low-wing monoplane with tandem seating for two and powered by a  Continental C-125 or equivalent engine. Constructed from wood and fabric, it has a fixed nosewheel landing gear.

Specifications

References

Notes

Bibliography

External links

1990s United States civil utility aircraft
Homebuilt aircraft